The 1890 United States elections occurred in the middle of Republican President Benjamin Harrison's term. Members of the 52nd United States Congress were chosen in this election. The Republicans suffered major losses due to the Panic of 1890 and the unpopularity of the McKinley Tariff. The Populist Party also emerged as an important third party.

Republicans suffered massive losses to Democrats in the House, and the Democrats took control of the chamber.

In the Senate, Democrats made minor gains, but Republicans kept control of the chamber. The Populists joined the Senate for the first time, electing two senators.

See also
1890 United States House of Representatives elections
1890–91 United States Senate elections

References

Further reading
 Cooper, William J. "Economics or Race: An Analysis of the Gubernatorial Election of 1890 in South Carolina." South Carolina Historical Magazine 73.4 (1972): 209–219. online
 Holmes, William F. "The Southern Farmers' Alliance and the Georgia Senatorial Election of 1890." Journal of Southern History 50.2 (1984): 197–224.
 Jensen, Richard J. The Winning of the Midwest: Social and Political Conflict, 1888-1896 (1971). pp. 89–153. online
 Reed, Thomas B. "The Federal Control of Elections." The North American Review 150.403 (1890): 671–680. online
 Valelly, Richard M. "Partisan Entrepreneurship and Policy Windows: George Frisbie Hoar and the 1890 Federal Elections Bill." in Formative Acts: American Politics In The Making. (2007): 126–149.
 Wyman, Roger E. "Wisconsin ethnic groups and the election of 1890." Wisconsin Magazine of History (1968): 269–293.

1890 elections in the United States
1890
United States midterm elections